"Easy Tonight" is the debut single by American singer-songwriter Five for Fighting. It was released in September 2000 as the lead single from his second album America Town. It was re-released in March 2002 after the success of the album's second single, "Superman (It's Not Easy)".

Music video
The music video was directed by Nancy Bardawil and produced by Michael Pierce. It premiered on MTV, VH1 and MTV2 in March 2002.

Charts

References

2000 songs
2000 debut singles
2002 singles
Five for Fighting songs
Songs written by John Ondrasik
Columbia Records singles